Traveler from India is an Iranian Drama and Romance series. The series was directed by Ghasem Jafari.

Storyline 
Ramin Naderi (Soroosh Goudarzi) goes to India to study. He is going to marry his cousin Parvaneh (Elham Hamidi), but he meets an Indian girl named Sita (Shila Khodadad) and brings her to Iran for marriage. But Sita's arrival in Iran creates problems.

Cast 
 Shila Khodadad
 Soroosh Goudarzi
 Hamid Goudarzi
 Shirin Bina
 Nasrin Moghanloo
 Iraj Nozari
 Farzad Hassani
 Behnoosh Tabatabaei
 Elham Hamidi
 Majid Moshiri
 Zohreh Fakour Sabour
 Alirum Nouraei
 Dariush Salimi
 Enayatallah Shafiei
 Bahman Goudarzi
 Kamran Fiuzat
 Hassan Assadi
 Tooran Ghaderi
 Felor Nazari
 Amin Zendegani
 Siamak Ghasemi
 Farahnaz Manfizaher
 Shabnam Moazezi

References

External links
 

Iranian television series
2000s Iranian television series